The 51st Division was created In February 1949 under the Regulation of the Redesignations of All Organizations and Units of the Army, issued by Central Military Commission on November 1, 1948, basing on the 1st, 3rd Independent Brigade and Independent Detachment of Jiluyu Military District.

The division is part of 17th Corps. Under the flag of 51st division it took part in the Chinese civil war. On March 13, 1952 the division was disbanded.

As of disbandment division was composed of:
151st Regiment;
152nd Regiment;
153rd Regiment.

References

中国人民解放军各步兵师沿革，http://blog.sina.com.cn/s/blog_a3f74a990101cp1q.html

051
Military units and formations disestablished in 1952
Military units and formations established in 1949